Admiral Sir Henry John Leeke, KCB, KH, DL (1 September 1792 – 26 February 1870) was a Royal Navy officer who went on to be Third Naval Lord, Member of Parliament for Dover and Deputy Lieutenant of Hampshire.

Career
Leeke was born on the Isle of Wight to Samuel Leeke, a deputy lieutenant of Hampshire, and his wife, Sophia, daughter of Capt. Richard Bargus, R.N. He younger brother was William Leeke, known for his reminiscences of his service as an ensign at the Battle of Waterloo. His godfather was Lord Henry Paulet.

Leeke entered the navy in September 1803 aboard the Royal William, as a first-class volunteer. He steadily rose through the ranks until reaching the rank of commander on 1814. In 1818, while in command of HMS Myrmidon he captured a Portuguese slave-vessel, and freed Samuel Ajayi Crowther, who later became Bishop of Niger. He was given command of HMS Queen, in which he served as flag-captain to Admiral Sir John West, in 1845 and of HMS San Josef in 1847 and, having been promoted to rear admiral in 1854, he became Third Naval Lord in 1859. His promotion to vice-admiral came in 1860, and to admiral in 1864.

In 1859, he was elected as Conservative Party Member of Parliament for Dover.

He was knighted in the Royal Guelphic Order in 1836, appointed a Companion of the Order of the Bath in 1857, and knighted in that order in 1858.

Family
Leeke married Augusta Sophia (d. 1861), the second daughter of James Dashwood in 1818. They had at least two children. Following Augusta's death, Leeke married (in 1863) Georgiana Lucy Cecilia, only daughter of Revd. Geoffrey Hornby. His eldest and only surviving son, Henry Edward Leeke, died on 2 May 1885, aged 59.

References

External links
 
National Archives, Sir Henry Leeke, ID P17067

|-

1792 births
1870 deaths
Royal Navy admirals
Conservative Party (UK) MPs for English constituencies
UK MPs 1859–1865
Royal Navy West Africa Squadron personnel
Knights Commander of the Order of the Bath
Members of the Parliament of the United Kingdom for Dover
Lords of the Admiralty